Finningen is a municipality in the district of Dillingen in Bavaria in Germany. It is 7 km north of the town of Dillingen. The population is 1206 (as of 2017). The town is a member of the municipal association Höchstädt an der Donau.

References

Dillingen (district)